Vladimir Grigoryevich Fedotov (18 January 1943 – 29 March 2009) was a Soviet football striker and manager who holds the all-time record of caps for CSKA Moscow. He was the son of famous Soviet football and ice hockey player Grigory Fedotov.

Career 
His only professional club was CSKA (1960–1975, 382 matches and 92 goals in the Soviet Top League); also he made 22 appearances for the Soviet Union national team between 1970 and 1975, scoring 4 goals. After Fedotov ended his playing career, he became a manager.

References

External links
 Vladimir Fedotov's profile at Spartak's official website 
 Profile and interview 
 Official website from LEVSKI2000 

1943 births
2009 deaths
Footballers from Moscow
Russian footballers
Soviet footballers
Soviet football managers
FC Metallurg Lipetsk managers
Russian football managers
PFC CSKA Moscow players
Soviet Top League players
Soviet Union international footballers
FC Asmaral Moscow managers
Al-Muharraq SC managers
FC Spartak Vladikavkaz managers
FC Sokol Saratov managers
FC Chernomorets Novorossiysk managers
FC Spartak Moscow managers
Russian Premier League managers
PFC Levski Sofia managers
Expatriate football managers in Bahrain
FC SKA Rostov-on-Don managers
FC Arsenal Tula managers
Association football forwards